Wubi, WUBI or wubi may refer to:
 Wubi method, a Chinese character input method
Wubi 86, a version of Wubi method
 Wubi (software) (Windows-based Ubuntu Installer), an installer for the Ubuntu operating system
 WSCG (TV), a television station in Georgia, USA, originally called WUBI